Kimbe is an administrative ward in Kilindi District of Tanga Region in Tanzania. 
According to the 2012 census, the ward has a total population of 14,249.

References

Wards of Tanga Region